Heera Panna is a 1973 Hindi romance film. Written, produced and directed by Dev Anand for Navketan films, the film stars Dev Anand, Zeenat Aman, Raakhee, Rehman, Jeevan, A.K. Hangal, Paintal and Dheeraj Kumar. The film's music was composed by R. D. Burman.

Plot 
Heera (Dev Anand) has two passions in his life, namely photography and his love for Reema (Raakhee), an air-hostess. When Reema passes away during an airplane accident, Heera is left with his only passion in life – photography. During one of his photographic sessions with Raja Sahab (Rehman), a priceless diamond is stolen by Panna (Zeenat Aman) and is hidden in Heera's car. When Heera learns about this theft and that he is in possession of the stolen property, he decides to turn Panna to the police but discovers to his shock that Panna is Reema's younger sister. Feeling pity for her, Heera decides not to. While Heera describes her how he met Reema in a plane, how they fell in love and the tragic accident resulting in her death, Panna narrates how she was tempted by Anil (Dheeraj Kumar) and ultimately forced into joining the dark world of theft and robbery. Hearing all this, Heera remembers how Reema once told him to take care of her sister and vows to save her from the ruffians. Soon Anil and his men along with Hari's (Jeevan) (the group's mastermind) goons reach Heera and Panna's hiding place. In the confrontation that takes place, they fail to snatch the diamond away from Heera but Panna gets hit fatally and eventually succumbs to her wounds. Police along with Raja Sahab and Panna's father arrive; Heera who is accused of stealing the diamond proves himself innocent and hands over the same to the police who arrests all the henchmen. The film ends as Heera drives away his car, left with the memories of both Reema and Panna.

Cast 
Dev Anand as Heera 
Zeenat Aman as Panna
Raakhee as Reema 
Rehman as Raja Sahib
Jeevan as Hari
Paintal as Kamal
Sudhir as Kamran
Sheetal as Ratna
A. K. Hangal as Diwan Karan Singh
Manmohan as Veeru
Mac Mohan as Anil's Photographer
Dheeraj Kumar as Anil

Crew 
Director – Dev Anand
Writer – Dev Anand, Suraj Sanim (additional dialogue)
Producer – Dev Anand, Kalpana Kartik (associate)
Editor – Babu Sheikh, Ashok Bandekar (assistant), Achyut Gupte (color consultant)
Cinematographer – Fali Mistry
Art Director – T. K. Desai
Production Company – Navketan International Films
Production Manager – Rashid Abbasi, Kumar D. Bhutani, R. S. Manian, Manohar, N. Mehra
Assistant Director – Vishwamitter Adil, Gogi Anand
Assistant Art Director – Nana, Sharad Pole
Costume and Wardrobe – Amarnath, Balchandra
Music Director – Rahul Dev Burman
Music Assistant – Basudeb Chakraborty, Maruti Rao, Manohari Singh
Lyricist – Anand Bakshi
Playback Singers – Kishore Kumar, Asha Bhosle, Lata Mangeshkar

Music 
The music of the film was composed by Rahul Dev Burman and the lyrics were written by Anand Bakshi
The song "Panna Ki Tamanna Hai" was listed at #14 on the Binaca Geetmala annual list 1974.

External links 
 

Films scored by R. D. Burman
1973 films
1970s Hindi-language films
Films directed by Dev Anand
1973 drama films
Films about photographers
Indian romance films